Anostostomatidae is a family of insects in the order Orthoptera, widely distributed in the southern hemisphere. It is named Mimnermidae or Henicidae in some taxonomies, and common names include king crickets in Australia and South Africa, and wētā in New Zealand (although not all wētā are in Anostostomatidae). Prominent members include the Parktown prawn of South Africa, and the giant wētā of New Zealand. The distribution of this family reflects a common ancestry before the fragmenting of Gondwana.

General characteristics
Members of this family can be quite large: Parktown prawn can exceed 6 cm and tree weta can exceed 8 cm in length.

Some Australian anostostomatids have wings (e.g. Exogryllacris, Gryllotaurus, Transaevum), while most lack wings (e.g. Anostostoma, Hemiandrus, Hypocophoides, Penalva).

Males of many species have highly modified heads, which they use in male-male conflicts.

By virtue of their ability to cope with variations in temperature, members of the family Anostostomatidae can be found in a variety of environments including alpine, forests, grasslands, shrub lands and urban gardens. The family is widely distributed across southern hemisphere lands including South America, Australia, South Africa and New Zealand.

Diet 
The wetas of New Zealand, such as Hemideina, are mostly herbivores that feed on leaves, fruit and flowers, but may also scavenge recently killed invertebrates.

The king crickets of Australia include generalised scavengers that consume various dead and decaying matter, specialised feeders (e.g. Exogryllacris feeds on fungal fruiting bodies growing on fallen trees) and predators of other invertebrates. There is a record of an Australian king cricket preying on a funnel-web spider.

Behaviour 
Anostostomatidae are nocturnal. They generally become active soon after sunset.

Anostostomatidae communicate with sound, both through the air and as ground waves through soil, wood and sand. Adults of both sexes and also nymphs can produce sound. These crickets hear sound using foretibial tympana or other modifications to the tibiae, tarsi and perhaps prothorax.

As one example, Anostostoma can stridulate by rubbing its abdomen against its hind legs. The sides of the base of the abdomen have dense patches of short, sharp pegs, and there are similar pegs on the inner surfaces of the hind femurs. Sound is produced by these pegs rubbing together.

Anostostomatidae use various behaviours to defend against predators. Many hide in burrows during the day to avoid diurnal predators. If disturbed by a predator, they may jump away, stridulate, eject putrid-smelling faeces, bite, fly away (done by winged Exogryllacris and Gryllotaurus) or jump into water (done by Transaevum nymphs, which feed on streamsides).

Life cycle 
Like other orthopterans, Anostostomatidae go through the three stages of egg, nymph and adult. Life cycles in this family are often long, with egg development taking up to 18 months, nymphal development taking 1-3 years and involving 7-10 instars, and adults living for a year or more. Adult females may brood eggs and young nymphs in isolated chambers.

Taxonomy and evolution
At least one Cretaceous fossil of an anostostomatid-like cricket is known from Australia but has not been described. The modern distribution of this family in the southern hemisphere has led to speculation that members of this group owe their distribution to the breakup of the ancient supercontinent Gondwana. This may be the case but evidence for the large scale if not total submergence of continental crust in the New Zealand and New Caledonian region in the Oligocene, indicates the possibility that wētā have arrived in these locations since re-emergence of land. The fact that anostostomatid crickets also occur on some Japanese islands supports this possibility.

Subfamilies and Genera
The Orthoptera Species File lists the following;

Anabropsinae
Auth.: Rentz & Weissman, 1973 – Americas, Africa, India, E. Asia, Australasia
 tribe Anabropsini Rentz & Weissman, 1973
 Anabropsis Rehn, 1901 (includes subgenera Paterdecolyus Griffini, 1913, Apteranabropsis and Pteranabropsis Gorochov, 1988)
 Exogryllacris Willemse, 1963: monotypic E. ornata Willemse, 1963 - Australia
  Melanabropsis Wang & Liu, 2020 - China, Japan
 tribe Brachyporini Gorochov, 2001 - Southern Africa, Australia
 Brachyporus Brunner von Wattenwyl, 1888
 Penalva Walker, 1870

Anostostomatinae
Auth.: Saussure, 1859 – Africa (including Madagascar), Australia, New Zealand

 Anostostoma 
 Apotetamenus 
 Bochus 
 Borborothis 
 Carcinopsis
 Gryllotaurus
 Henicus Gray, 1837
 Libanasidus, king crickets
 Motuweta, tusked wētā
 Nasidius Stål, 1876
 Onosandridus 
 Onosandrus 
 Spizaphilus

Cratomelinae
Auth.: Brunner von Wattenwyl, 1888 – South America
 Cratomelus Blanchard, 1851

Deinacridinae
Auth.: Karny, 1932 – New Zealand
 Deinacrida, giant wētā
 Hemideina, tree wētā

Leiomelinae
Auth.: Gorochov, 2001 – S. America
 Leiomelus Ander, 1936

Lezininae
Auth.: Karny, 1932 – N. Africa, Middle East
 Lezina Walker, 1869

Lutosinae
Auth.: Gorochov, 1988 – Central & S. America, Africa, PNG
 Apotetamenus Brunner von Wattenwyl, 1888
 Hydrolutos Issa & Jaffe, 1999
 Libanasa Walker, 1869
 Licodia Walker, 1869
 Lutosa Walker, 1869
 Neolutosa Gorochov, 2001
 Papuaistus Griffini, 1911
 Rhumosa Hugel & Desutter-Grandcolas, 2018

Subfamily not assigned
 tribe Glaphyrosomatini Rentz & Weissman, 1973
 Cnemotettix Caudell, 1916
 Glaphyrosoma Brunner von Wattenwyl, 1888
 incertae sedis
 Aistus Brunner von Wattenwyl, 1888
 Anisoura Ander, 1932 – monotypic Northland tusked wētā: A. nicobarica Ander, 1932
 Coccinellomima Karny, 1932 – monotypic C. shelfordi Karny, 1932
 Dolichochaeta Philippi, 1863 – monotypic D. longicornis Philippi, 1863
 Gryllacropsis Brunner von Wattenwyl, 1888 – monotypic (India) G. magniceps (Walker, 1870)
 Hemiandrus Ander, 1938 - ground wētā
 Hypocophoides Karny, 1930
 Hypocophus Brunner von Wattenwyl, 1888
 Leponosandrus Gorochov, 2001 – monotypic L. lepismoides (Walker, 1871)
 Transaevum Johns, 1997 – monotypic T. laudatum Johns, 1997

King crickets of South Africa
The best-known species is the Parktown prawn, not to be confused with the well-known Koringkrieke or armoured ground crickets, which never have been in the family Anostostomatidae.

Henicus monstrosus is a nocturnal anostostomatid. The males are unusual in their anatomy; their heads are disproportionately large and bear forward-directed prongs. They have extremely long, curved mandibles that are functional, but seem to play no part in the eating process.

Wētā of New Zealand

Five genera of New Zealand wētā are part of the family Anostostomatidae:
 Giant wētā (Deinacrida)
 Ground wētā (Hemiandrus)
 Northland tusked wētā (Anisoura)
 Tree wētā (Hemideina)
 Tusked wētā (Motuweta)

The cave wētā species belong to a different family, the Rhaphidophoridae.

Literature 
 
  1997: The Gondwanaland weta: family Anostostomatidae (formerly in Stenopelmatidae, Henicidae or Mimnermidae): nomenclatural problems, world checklist, new genera and species. Journal of Orthoptera Research, 6: 125–138. ,

References

External links

 Family Anostostomatidae Saussure, 1859 at Orthoptera Species File Online
 The Families Stenopelmatidae and Anostostomatidae (Orthoptera). 1. Higher Classification, New and Little Known Taxa

 
Orthoptera families